Gompholobium gairdnerianum is a species of flowering plant in the family Fabaceae and is endemic to the far west of Western Australia. It is an erect, slender, multistemmed shrub with yellow, pea-like flowers.

Description

Taxonomy
Gompholobium gairdnerianum was first formally described in 2008 by Jennifer Anne Chappill in Australian Systematic Botany from specimens collected near Mount Lesueur in 1979. The specific epithet (gairdnerianum) refers to the Gairdner Range where this species occurs.

Distribution and habitat
This pea grows in sandy to gravelly soil and sand on hills and ridges in the Geraldton Sandplains biogeographic region in the far west of Western Australia.

Conservation status
Gompholobium gairdnerianum is classified as "Priority Three" by the Government of Western Australia Department of Parks and Wildlife meaning that it is poorly known and known from only a few locations but is not under imminent threat.

References

gairdnerianum
Eudicots of Western Australia
Plants described in 2008